Acyl-CoA synthetase family member 3 is an enzyme that in humans is encoded by the ACSF3 gene.

Structure 
The ACSF3 gene is located on the 16th chromosome, with its specific location being 16q24.3. The gene contains 17 exons. ASCL4 encodes a 64.1 kDa protein that is composed of 576 amino acids; 20 peptides have been observed through mass spectrometry data.

Function 
This gene encodes a member of the acetyl—CoA synthetase family of enzymes that activate fatty acids by catalyzing the formation of a thioester linkage between fatty acids and coenzyme A. The encoded protein is localized to mitochondria, has high specificity for malonate and methylmalonate and possesses malonyl-CoA synthetase activity.

Clinical significance 
Mutations in this gene have been shown to cause combined malonic and methylmalonic aciduria (CMAMMA). CMAMMA is a condition characterized by high levels of malonic acid and methylmalonic acid, because deficiencies in this gene cause these metabolites to not be broken down. The disease is typically diagnosed by either genetic testing or higher levels of methylmalonic acid than malonic acid, although both are elevated. By calculating the malonic acid to methylmalonic acid ratio in blood plasma, CMAMMA can be distinguished from classic methylmalonic acidemia. The disorder typically presents symptoms early in childhood, first starting with high levels of acid in the blood (ketoacidosis). The disorder can also present as involuntary muscle tensing (dystonia), weak muscle tone (hypotonia), developmental delay, an inability to grow and gain weight at the expected rate (failure to thrive), low blood sugar (hypoglycemia), and coma. Some affected children can even have microcephaly. Other people with CMAMMA do not develop signs and symptoms until adulthood. These individuals usually have neurological problems, such as seizures, loss of memory, a decline in thinking ability, or psychiatric diseases.

References

Further reading

External links 
 

EC 6.2.1